Isanthrene felderi is a moth of the subfamily Arctiinae. It was described by Herbert Druce in 1883. It is found in Mexico, Guatemala, Costa Rica and Ecuador.

References

 

Euchromiina
Moths described in 1883